Ōkura is a northern suburb of the North Shore, part of the contiguous metropolitan area in Auckland, New Zealand. It is under the local governance of the Auckland Council. The official name is spelled with a macron.

Ōkura is a small village on the south shore of the Okura River. It is the only location that provides access to the Okura River in the form of basic launching facilities for small craft.

The New Zealand Ministry for Culture and Heritage gives a translation of "place of red (clay)" for Ōkura.

History

The area was traditionally referred to by the name Karepiro, and was in rohe of the Ngāti Manuhiri iwi (tribe). The north shore of the Okura River was the location of Otaimaro, an extensive settlement. In 1848, Henry Dacre and his father Captain Ranulph Dacre purchased the land surrounding the river, creating the Weiti Station. Their house, the Dacre Cottage, was built circa 1855 on the north shore of the river from locally made bricks.

Demographics
The settlement is part of the larger Okura Bush statistical area.

Ōkura settlement had a population of 372 at the 2018 New Zealand census, an increase of 15 people (4.2%) since the 2013 census, and an increase of 48 people (14.8%) since the 2006 census. There were 132 households, comprising 195 males and 180 females, giving a sex ratio of 1.08 males per female, with 63 people (16.9%) aged under 15 years, 75 (20.2%) aged 15 to 29, 177 (47.6%) aged 30 to 64, and 63 (16.9%) aged 65 or older.

Ethnicities were 93.5% European/Pākehā, 5.6% Māori, 0.8% Pacific peoples, 4.0% Asian, and 3.2% other ethnicities. People may identify with more than one ethnicity.

Although some people chose not to answer the census's question about religious affiliation, 62.1% had no religion, 29.0% were Christian, 0.8% were Hindu and 4.8% had other religions.

Of those at least 15 years old, 87 (28.2%) people had a bachelor's or higher degree, and 30 (9.7%) people had no formal qualifications. 72 people (23.3%) earned over $70,000 compared to 17.2% nationally. The employment status of those at least 15 was that 156 (50.5%) people were employed full-time, 54 (17.5%) were part-time, and 15 (4.9%) were unemployed.

Okura Bush statistical area

Okura Bush had a population of 1,332 at the 2018 New Zealand census, an increase of 48 people (3.7%) since the 2013 census, and an increase of 207 people (18.4%) since the 2006 census. There were 432 households, comprising 681 males and 651 females, giving a sex ratio of 1.05 males per female. The median age was 39.7 years (compared with 37.4 years nationally), with 237 people (17.8%) aged under 15 years, 285 (21.4%) aged 15 to 29, 633 (47.5%) aged 30 to 64, and 174 (13.1%) aged 65 or older.

Ethnicities were 83.8% European/Pākehā, 5.9% Māori, 1.8% Pacific peoples, 14.0% Asian, and 1.8% other ethnicities. People may identify with more than one ethnicity.

The percentage of people born overseas was 37.8, compared with 27.1% nationally.

Although some people chose not to answer the census's question about religious affiliation, 58.8% had no religion, 32.2% were Christian, 0.5% had Māori religious beliefs, 0.2% were Hindu, 0.5% were Muslim, 1.1% were Buddhist and 1.8% had other religions.

Of those at least 15 years old, 309 (28.2%) people had a bachelor's or higher degree, and 99 (9.0%) people had no formal qualifications. The median income was $40,200, compared with $31,800 nationally. 276 people (25.2%) earned over $70,000 compared to 17.2% nationally. The employment status of those at least 15 was that 579 (52.9%) people were employed full-time, 183 (16.7%) were part-time, and 27 (2.5%) were unemployed.

References

Populated places in the Auckland Region
Hibiscus Coast
Populated places around the Hauraki Gulf / Tīkapa Moana